Diandra is a given name. Notable people with the name include:

Diandra Asbaty (born 1980), American bowler 
Diandra Flores (born 1994), Finnish pop singer, better known by her mononym Diandra
Diandra Soares (born 1979), Indian model, anchor, and film actress